Long Hard Ride is the fifth studio album by The Marshall Tucker Band, released in 1976 and produced by Paul Hornsby. Guest performers included Charlie Daniels, John McEuen and Jerome Joseph. The title track was made into a short film that was played as a sort of movie trailer. It depicts the members of the band as a gang of cowboys. The album's cover features Frank C. McCarthy's painting "The Last Crossing" (1972). Cover design and art direction John Kosh.

Track listing
All songs written by Toy Caldwell, except where noted.

Side one
"Long Hard Ride" - 3:48
"Property Line" - 2:57
"Am I the Kind of Man" - 4:21
"Walkin' the Streets Alone" - 5:05

Side two
"Windy City Blues" (Jerry Eubanks, Doug Gray, George McCorkle) - 4:53
"Holding On to You" (McCorkle) - 3:48
"You Say You Love Me" - 3:57
"You Don't Live Forever" (Tommy Caldwell) - 3:55

CD 2004 reissue bonus track
"See You One More Time" - 4:54

Charts
Album

Personnel
Doug Gray - lead vocals, percussion
Toy Caldwell - electric and acoustic guitars, steel guitar, lead vocals on "Property Line"
Tommy Caldwell - bass guitar, backing vocals
George McCorkle - electric and acoustic guitars, banjo
Jerry Eubanks - flute, alto, baritone and tenor saxophone, backing vocals
Paul Riddle - drums

Production
Paul Hornsby - Producer
George Marino - Mastering engineer

References

1976 albums
Marshall Tucker Band albums
Albums produced by Paul Hornsby
Capricorn Records albums